Olangthagee Wangmadasoo (English: Even Beyond the Summer Horizon) is a 1980 Indian Meitei language film written by M. K. Binodini Devi, produced by G. Narayan Sharma and directed by Aribam Syam Sharma. The film features Kangabam Tomba, Yengkhom Roma and Kshetrimayum Rashi in the lead roles. The movie was censored in 1979 and released at Friends Talkies, Paona Bazar on 18 January 1980. It was the first ever and the only Manipuri film to run for more than 30 weeks, till date. The film ran for 32 weeks at the box office.

The movie was among the films screened at the International Film Festival of India 2015 under the section A special retrospective on ace filmmaker Aribam Shyam Sharma.

Synopsis
The film revolves around the story of Bijoy and Thadoi who fall in love and decide to marry each other. Their first meeting takes place at a musical night in which Bijoy is one of the singers. Thadoi is a medical student and also writes poems which are set to tune by Bijoy. Bijoy's grandfather wants him to learn the art of swordsmanship while the grandmother wants him to study music and singing. They are serious about his marriage. On the other hand, Thadoi's brother Kamaljit and his wife want her to marry a rich family friend Jiten. Thadoi elopes with Bijoy, but they get separated when Kamaljit agrees to perform kanyadaan for her, although this is a promise that he breaks.

When Bijoy's grandfather comes to discuss the matter, he is attacked by Kamaljit's goons and he dies. However, despite the obstacles that are put in their way by Kamaljit, their love does not die. The plot is interspersed with several incidents that add a twist to the tale, such as the attack on Bijoy, his grandfather's death, a pilgrimage and a kidnapping. Several twists in the tale are added until all the misunderstandings are sorted out and Bijoy and Thadoi are finally reconciled.

Cast
 Kangabam Tomba as Bijoy
 Yengkhom Roma as Thadoi
 Kshetrimayum Rashi as Widow
 Soraisam Keshoram
 Tondon
 Joykumar

Reception
The Northeast Today wrote, "This Aribam Syam Sharma movie won the National Award. Starring Kangabam Tomba, Yengkhom Roma and Rashi, Keshoram, so popular was the movie that it is believed to have surpassed the Bollywood super-hit movie, Sholay in Manipur."

Production
This movie is a production from N.S. Films (Narayan Sharma Films), the production company which also gave box-office hits like Lamja Parshuram (1974) and Saaphabee (1976).

Soundtrack
The movie has nine songs sung by four playback singers.

Accolades
The movie won the Rajat Kamal for the National Film Award for Best Feature Film in Manipuri at the 27th National Film Awards.

Khumanthem Prakash won the Best Lyrics Award in the 1st Manipur State Film Festival 1984 for the film.

References

External links
 

1979 films
Meitei-language films
Indian black-and-white films
Films directed by Aribam Syam Sharma